Schinia nundina, the goldenrod flower moth,  is a moth of the family Noctuidae. The species was first described by Dru Drury in 1773. It is found in North America from Minnesota to southern Ontario and Nova Scotia, south to central Florida and southern Texas. Records include Arizona, Kansas, Nebraska, New York, Maryland, Oklahoma and South Carolina.

There is one generation per year.

The larvae feed on Aster and Solidago.

References

"Schinia nundina". Moths of Maryland. Retrieved March 23, 2020.

Schinia
Moths of North America
Moths described in 1773